This is a list of Billboard magazine's Top Hot 100 songs of 1992.

No song that appeared in the 1991 year-end had managed to appear in the 1992 year-end.

See also
1992 in music
List of Billboard Hot 100 number-one singles of 1992
List of Billboard Hot 100 top-ten singles in 1992

References

1992 record charts
Billboard charts